Abel Bonnard (19 December 1883  31 May 1968) was a French poet, novelist and politician.

Biography
Born in Poitiers, Vienne, his early education was in Marseilles with secondary studies at the Lycée Louis-le-Grand in Paris. A student of literature, he was a graduate of the École du Louvre.

Politically, a follower of Charles Maurras, his views evolved towards fascism in the 1930s. Bonnard was one of the ministers of National Education under the Vichy regime (1942–44). The political satirist Jean Galtier-Boissière gave him the nickname "la Gestapette", a portmanteau of Gestapo and tapette, the latter French slang for a homosexual. The name, along with the homosexual inclinations it implied, became well known. He was a member of the committee of the Groupe Collaboration, an organisation that aimed to encourage closer cultural ties between France and Germany.

Bonnard was one of only a few members expelled from the Académie française after World War II for collaboration with Germany. Bonnard was condemned in absentia to death during the épuration légale period for wartime activities. However, he had escaped to Spain where Francisco Franco granted him political asylum. In 1960, he returned to France to face retrial for his crimes. Bonnard received a symbolic sentence of 10 years banishment to be counted from 1945, but dissatisfied with the verdict, he chose to return to Spain where he lived out the remainder of his life.

Bibliography

1906  Les Familiers
1908  Les Histoires
1908  Les Royautés
1913  La Vie et l'Amour
1914  Le Palais Palmacamini
1918  La France et ses morts
1924  Notes de voyage : En Chine (1920-1921), 2 vol.
1926  Éloge de l'ignorance
1926  La vie amoureuse d'Henri Beyle
1927  L'Enfance
1928  L'Amitié
1928  L'Argent
1929  Saint François d'Assise
1931  Rome
1936  Le drame du présent : Les Modérés
1937  Savoir aimer
1939  L'Amour et l'Amitié
1941  Pensées dans l'action
1992  Ce monde et moi (selection of aphorisms, posthumous)

References

External links
  L'Académie française

1883 births
1968 deaths
People from Poitiers
French collaborators with Nazi Germany
French fascists
French emigrants to Spain
20th-century French poets
Lycée Louis-le-Grand alumni
Expelled members of the Académie Française
French Ministers of National Education
20th-century French novelists
20th-century French male writers
French politicians convicted of crimes